Fiorin Durmishaj (born 14 November 1996) is an Albanian-born Greek professional footballer who plays as a forward for Cypriot First Division club Olympiakos Nicosia, on loan from OFI.

Club career

Panionios
Durmishaj made his debut on 1 November 2014, as a substitute in a 2–2 away Superleague draw game against Veria.

Olympiacos
In December 2018, Panionios' striker Fiorin Durmishaj is on the verge of officially joining Olympiacos. In Nea Smyrni, Durmishaj has been making notable progress in the 2018–19 season. On 18 June 2019, he officially signed a contract with Greek powerhouse Olympiacos. On 28 December 2019, Durmishaj who spent the first half of the season on loan at Waasland-Beveren in Belgium, spent the second half of the season with Aris. On 29 July 2020, he was loaned out to AEL.

OFI
On 26 August 2021, Durmishaj joined OFI on a three-year contract.

International career

Albania
Durmishaj received his first international call up at the Albania national under-21 team by coach Redi Jupi for the 2017 UEFA European Under-21 Championship qualification match against Hungary U21 on 13 October 2015.

Durmishaj was called up by coach Alban Bushi for the friendly match against France U21, on 5 June 2017 and the 2019 UEFA European Under-21 Championship qualification opening match against Estonia U21, on 12 June 2017. In the opening match of the qualifiers against Estonia U21, Durmishaj was an unused substitute in the bench for the entire match. He scored his first international goal for Albania U21, on 4 September 2017 against Iceland U21 in the 75th minute to give Albania U21 an away 2–3 victory, the first one of the competition.

Greece
In March 2019, Durmishaj was designated to represent Greece but one document remained to allow his participation. The young winger, who played for Albania as a youth international is a Greek citizen and the Hellenic Football Federation needed to assemble all the required documents that would enable the 22-year-old to play for the national team. The Albanian Football Association needed to provide that document, and it was expected to be done in time for Durmishaj to participate in the first two UEFA Euro 2020 qualifying matches against Liechtenstein and Bosnia and Herzegovina. 

On 24 March 2019 and on the road, ahead of the crucial upcoming UEFA Euro 2020 qualifying match against Bosnia and Herzegovina, head coach of the Greece national team, Angelos Anastasiadis summoned Durmishhaj to replace the injured Kostas Mitroglou. He made his debut on 30 May 2019, in a friendly against Turkey, as a 65th-minute substitute for Giorgos Masouras.

Career statistics

Club

References

External links

Fiorin Durmishaj at the Albanian Football Association

1996 births
Living people
Footballers from Vlorë
Albanian footballers
Association football forwards
Greek footballers
Greece international footballers
Albania youth international footballers
Albania under-21 international footballers
Greek people of Albanian descent
Albanian emigrants to Greece
Naturalized citizens of Greece
Panionios F.C. players
Kallithea F.C. players
PAS Lamia 1964 players
Olympiacos F.C. players
S.K. Beveren players
Aris Thessaloniki F.C. players
Athlitiki Enosi Larissa F.C. players
OFI Crete F.C. players
Olympiakos Nicosia players
Super League Greece players
Football League (Greece) players
Belgian Pro League players
Albanian expatriate footballers
Albanian expatriate sportspeople in Greece
Expatriate footballers in Greece
Expatriate footballers in Belgium
People from Vlorë